Clipgenerator is an online and mobile multimedia application and videocreation technology which generates animated music video clips from User photos and videos. It allows Users to legally combine licensed music with their own visual content.
The Clipgenerator Technology does also apply for auto-created videos, product-clips or video-ads as well as interactive marketing-mechanism.

The patent is held by Trivid GmbH ("Tri" = Latin for 3 as a synonym for 3D and "vid" for video), an international online multimedia company based in Germany.

Distribution and number of users

The technology is available via the homepage as well as being integrated on various social networks including Facebook, Myspace, MyVideo, Bebo
,  Sevenload
.

The service in social networks and videocommunities is free to use and requires no login or registration. It is  instead financed through advertisements. The Video-Technology also offers pay-per-use models or premium-service.

Mode of operation

The Clipgenerator shall enable the average internet User to create a video clip with no special software or skills. The result of the video production is available for the User realtime with possibilities to edit images, video-flow, insert text and messages as well as use filter-options.

A Flash based editor is used to create with own artistically created effects and animations music-video-templates which are then synchronized and fitted to the rhythm, content, instrumentation etc. of the track selected by the User. The User needs only upload his or her pictures and videos, select the order in which they are to appear and click a button to generate the clip.

Once the User is finished, a clip is automatically created and made available in various formats including MPEG-4, Windows Media Video and QuickTime as well as Flash-format. The User may download the clip, forward it to friends via E-Mail or post it on a profile of their chosen community or streamed within own websites.

History

Basic concept

The concept for the Clipgenerator was conceived when the founder was looking for an alternative to the expensive and time-consuming creation of a professional  video clip in combination with quality-music. Being an entrepreneur unable to find a solution he decided to take the project on himself.

Whilst various solutions to create simple slideshows already existed, none combined licensed music with professional effects sequences as well as professional video-and film-synchronization and this was the basis idea for the technology.

Product development

Approximately one year after work began, a working prototype was produced after which a patent application was granted on August 31, 2006.

The founders financed all work on the project until the end of 2007. An incubator investor started to provide funding in 2008 to promote further development for mobile devices in cooperation with the Media High School of Stuttgart as well further deployment of video-technology and a complex music-rights-management system.

Development for the second version focused on an improvement in image analysis and recognition software for images as well working towards the standards of Flash, Flex, Ajax, an improved 3D environment, enhancement of templates with parameters, elements, image effects, fading, keying, creation of key-frame animations, and to utilise real time rendering, an entirely automatic audio analysis and potential new GPU rendering options.

Version 2 (a Flex client) was launched as a beta in October 2009.

Products

The ClipgeneratorTM technology is offered in kind of three main products.

ClipgeneratorTM editor:

This product serves as the customized production of single video clips, under the individual selection of pictures, animations, music, texts, abdominal bandages, hyperlinks and logos. It is addressed both to private users, who are enabled to send their selfcreated clips (vacation, wedding videos etc. …) by hyperlink or mobile phone or to integrate them into social networks, as well as to business companies as a production of image clips, website videos, product videos, real estate-videos,  hotel videos, special clips or videos for presentations, fairs.

ClipgeneratorTM Webservice:

Primarily allotted to enterprises, this product serves for the automated production of video clips under use of video Template presentations via a direct interface to the data bank of the customer. The Video-clips are produced based on video-templates in an automated manner.  Data sources like picture pools,  product descriptions or price-tags can be automatically linked to the video-production process. This product is mainly addressed for example to bigger online shops, news / RSS-Feeds (for the masses-video-production of bigger content providers), real estate portals (for virtual inspection tours), or hotel chains or tourism suppliers to the constantly updated real time-video-conversion of the own offer.

ClipgeneratorTM Whitelabel:

This product is a Whitelabel solution for Consumer web pages like portals, communities, e-commerce and dating platforms to offer the videotechnology and multi source functionalities precleared on own web pages. The videotechnology which integrates the final user interactively becomes, on this occasion, an additional feature of the online offer. A licence model is offered to the integration in the own website. This solution integrates the functionalities of the clip generator into the web site of the customer in a personalized way.

Legal security of Cliptemplate technology

According to the provider the Cliptemplate technology allows legal use of protected pop music with user-generated content in the online and mobile fields, as the music catalogue made available is a priori authorised by all the rights owners. The user cannot modify the music templates. This is to make the combination of private content and protected music controllable. Without this, Copyright holders would be unwilling to allow others the use of their protected material in connection with user generated content. In the process, the content provider adopts the contract, billing and reporting system.

Awards and prizes

Winner of the Innovation of Music and Entertainment Award (IMEA) (Popkomm Berlin 2007)

Innovators Award (Cebit 2007) Runner-up in the field of “mobile content”

Convergators Award 2006 One of the top 3 finalists in the field of “digital living”

Constantinus 2006 (Austrian Award) One of the top 3 finalists

German Multimedia Award 2005 Finalist in the “Advertising/PR” category based on the criteria of concept/idea, usability, innovation, design and overall impression

Further reading

Christoph Weber, Anne Meckbach: E-Mail-basierte virale Werbeinstrumente - 
unzumutbare Belästigung oder modernes Marketing?. In: Multimedia und Recht (MMR), Nr. 8, 2007, S. 482-486.  Essay in German

References

External links
 Clipgenerator.com
 trivid.com
 Company History
 ClipGenerator Profile
 Article on Icolm.net
 Article on bignews.biz
 Clipgenerator on wikihow.com
 on Pc'sPlace.com
 Article in the  Internetworld 
 Article in the CHIP
 Article in Musikmarkt
 Article on dieliebebleibt.eu

Video editing software
Compositing software